John MacCallum (11 October 1883 – 29 November 1957) was a Scotland international rugby union player.

Rugby Union career

Amateur career

He played for Watsonians.

Provincial career

He represented Edinburgh District in 1910, captaining the side.

He played for the Blues Trial side against the Whites Trial side on 21 January 1911 while still with Watsonians.

International career

He played 26 times for Scotland, scoring 2 tries and 9 conversions for a total of 24 points.

Medical career

MacCallum became a doctor. He became an assistant surgeon for the Royal Sick Children Hospital in Glasgow.

He was a conscientious objector in the First World War. His medical training meant he was assigned a post in the army. At the time he was an Executive Tuberculosis officer for the County of Argyll. He had applied for his conscientious objector status but it had not come through. He was supposed to report to Stirling Castle for his conscription on 30 May 1916 and his non attendance found him in front of a judge in Oban Sheriff Court. MacCallum plead not guilty in view of his conscientious objection but the Sheriff found him guilty and gave him a choice of week's imprisonment or a £2 fine. The headline in The Scotsman "Fined as an absentee" indicated that MacCallum opted for the fine.

References

1883 births
1957 deaths
Blues Trial players
Edinburgh District (rugby union) players
Rugby union forwards
Rugby union players from Highland (council area)
Scotland international rugby union players
Scottish rugby union players
Watsonians RFC players